Pregnancy fetishism (also known as maiesiophilia or maieusophoria) is a context where pregnancy is seen by individuals or cultures as an erotic phenomenon. It may involve sexual attraction to women who are pregnant or appear pregnant, attraction to lactation, or attraction to particular stages of pregnancy such as impregnation or childbirth.

Characteristics
There are no particular or preferred elements within maiesiophilia that are common to all maiesiophiliacs. Some may pursue fantasies that are concerned with the circumstances in which a subject may give birth, or to the conditions to which the pregnant subject may find themselves acting upon, such as approaches to mobility, sleeping, and dressing. Particularly an enlarged abdomen is the reason for the attractiveness as well as more psychological aspects such as signs of fertility.

Culture

The naked appearance of actress Demi Moore in the advanced stage of pregnancy on the cover of Vanity Fair magazine in 1991 marked the beginning of a period which has since seen pregnancy presented by celebrities as a glamorous state of living, while also creating a market for photographers to produce images of pregnant mothers, and for fashion stylists to introduce "pregnancy styling" to their business.

Pregnancy has proven to be a very popular topic in the world of internet pornography, where searches for 'pregnancy porn' spiked on Pornhub in 2017, with searches increasing 20% since 2014.

Impregnation fantasies are characterized by the arousal or gratification from the possibility, consequences, or risk of impregnation through unprotected vaginal sex. Impregnation fantasies are often indulged by reading erotic literature and role playing with a partner.

See also
Alvinolagnia
Erotic lactation
Fat fetishism
Male pregnancy

References

 Katharine Gates (1999). Deviant Desires: Incredibly Strange Sex. Juno Books. . (p. 96)

External links 
Pregnancy Sex Positions: ideas for comfortable sex positions during pregnancy.

Human pregnancy
Sexual fetishism